The 2010 season of Bolivian football was the 99th season of competitive football in Bolivia.

National leagues

Men's

Torneo Apertura

Torneo Clausura

Relegation

Source:

Copa Simon Bolivar

The 2010 Copa Simon Bolivar started on August 6, 2010, and concluded on November 21, 2010. The Copa Simon Bolivar final was played between Real America and Nacional Potosi.

State Championship Champions Primera A

Bolivian clubs in international competitions

Bolivia national team
The following table lists all the games played by the Bolivian national team in official competitions and friendly matches during 2010.

Bolivia U-15

Bolivia U-20

References